KWEE (100.1 FM, "100.1 We FM") is a commercial radio station licensed to Dayton, Nevada, and serving the Reno metropolitan area and Lake Tahoe. It is owned by Lotus Communications and broadcasts an adult hits radio format. The radio studios are on Plum Lane in South Reno.

KWEE has an effective radiated power (ERP) of 12,000 watts. The transmitter is near Sunil Pandit Road on McClellan Peak northeast of Carson City. Programming is also heard on an FM translator in Crystal Bay, Nevada, K240CA at 95.9 MHz.

History
In 1990, the station first signed on as KZRT. It later used the call sign KLKT and was KZAK from late 1990 to 1997. That year, it switched its call sign to KTHX-FM. The call letters referred to the station's branding as "The X." The station aired an adult album alternative (AAA) format.

On September 27, 2021, the station announced through their social media that the "X" format would "retire" later that day; at 5:19 p.m., after playing "Here's Where the Story Ends" by The Sundays (immediately followed by simulated audio of a DJ leaving the studio and turning off the lights, branded on the station's online playlist as simply "goodbye X"- intentionally lowercase- and a brief moment of silence), KTHX-FM dropped its longtime AAA format after 24 years on the frequency and 31 years as a whole, and began stunting with instrumental jazz and big band music with sweepers stating that the station was "on hold", and emphasizing that "We will enjoy" the upcoming change to the station, set for September 30 at 10 a.m.

At that time, KTHX-FM flipped to adult hits, branded as "100.1 We FM", launching with a typical-for-radio run of 10,000 songs commercial-free, the first being "Get the Party Started" by P!nk. Coinciding with the change, Lotus also applied to change the station's call letters to KWEE, which took effect on October 5. The KTHX-FM call sign was transferred to another station owned by Lotus, at 94.5 MHz in Sun Valley, Nevada, an ESPN Radio Network affiliate that previously used the call letters KUUB.

References

External links
KWEE official website

WEE
Radio stations established in 1984
Lotus Communications stations
1984 establishments in Nevada
Adult hits radio stations in the United States